Music Industry 3. Fitness Industry 1. is the twelfth EP by Scottish post-rock band Mogwai. It was released on 1 December 2014 through Rock Action Records and Sub Pop.   It consists of three original tracks recorded during the sessions that produced the band's album Rave Tapes and three tracks from that album, remixed by different artists.

Track listing

Performers
Stuart Braithwaite – guitar, vocals 
Dominic Aitchison – bass 
Martin Bulloch – drums 
John Cummings - piano, guitar
Barry Burns – keyboards
Luke Sutherland - violin, strings, guitar, percussion

References

2014 EPs
Mogwai EPs
Rock Action Records albums
Sub Pop EPs